Radomirești is a commune in Olt County, Muntenia, Romania. It is composed of four villages: Călinești, Crăciunei, Poiana and  Radomirești.

On Radomirești, 68 ancient Greek silver coins from the 2nd century were discovered in 13 March 2021 by Paul Durca, a retired police officer, with a metal detector.

Natives
 Vergil Andronache

References

Communes in Olt County
Localities in Muntenia